Mustan Sydämen Rovio (Pyre of the Black Heart) is the debut solo album by Finnish singer and bassist Marko Hietala of Nightwish and Tarot fame, released on 24 May 2019 via Nuclear Blast.

Hietala is credited in the album with his birth name Marko, instead of Marco. He said he adopted the version with "c" when he was young and trying to sound "cool", but that now it doesn't matter to him anymore. He intends to be credited as Marko in all his future projects. He also referred to the "Marco" spelling as "the last lie I had constructed about myself".

An English version of the album was released on 24 January 2020.

Background, production and song information 
Mustan Sydämen Rovio spent 2.5 years in the making, with work on it commencing when Nightwish took a break in 2016.

It features songs that Hietala had been writing for years, some dating back to 20 years before its release. According to him, these are songs that either felt "too personal" for him or that couldn't fit his main bands. They discuss both personal and fictional stories. He defined the album's sound as "hard prog".

Nightwish's then session drummer Kai Hahto was initially considered for the album, but he got himself injured while renovating his house and was replaced by Hietala's old friend Anssi Nykänen.

"Isäni ääni", a tribute to fathers in general, was released as a single on 15 May 2019 and received a video directed by Ville Lipiäinen, who has directed several videos for Nightwish. The lyrics are inspired by his father, who died in 2012 following complications of alcoholism, which Hietala himself suffered from. He has been teetotal since 2010.

Track listing

Personnel
 Marko Hietala – lead vocals, bass
 Tuomas Wäinölä – guitar
 Vili Ollila – keyboards
 Anssi Nykänen – drums

Pyre of the Black Heart 

Mustan Sydämen Rovio was re-released in English under the title Pyre of the Black Heart on 24 January 2020, also via Nuclear Blast. Hietala says he wrote the songs both in Finnish and in English, which facilitated translations. He was initially unsure whether he would release two different albums at once or one album half in Finnish, half in English, before making the decision of releasing two different albums on different dates.

The English-language release was followed by a European tour, with shows opened up by Oceanhoarse.

Track listing

Personnel
 Marko Hietala – lead vocals, bass
 Tuomas Wäinölä – guitar
 Vili Ollila – keyboards
 Anssi Nykänen – drums

Critical reception 

Writing for Kerrang!, Steve Beebee rated Pyre of the Black Heart 4/5 and said it mostly "gives insight into what Marko's capable of when given a free run. It's a one-off, almost certainly, but a distraction of the most endearing kind.

References

2019 debut albums
Hard rock albums by Finnish artists
Progressive rock albums by Finnish artists